Glipodes tertia is a beetle in the genus Glipodes of the family Mordellidae. It was described in 1936 by Ray.

References

Mordellidae
Beetles described in 1936